Maxine Peake (born 14 July 1974) is an English actress and narrator. She is known for her roles as Twinkle in the BBC One sitcom dinnerladies (1998–2000), Veronica Ball in the hit Channel 4 comedy drama Shameless (2004–2007), Martha Costello in the BBC One legal drama Silk (2011–2014), and Grace Middleton in the BBC One drama series The Village (2013–2014). In 2017, she starred in the Black Mirror episode "Metalhead". She has also played the title role in Hamlet, as well as the notorious serial killer Myra Hindley in the critically acclaimed ITV dramatization of the Moors murders, See No Evil: The Moors Murders (2006).

Early life
Peake was born in Westhoughton, Bolton, on 14 July 1974, the second of two daughters born to Glenys (née Hall) and Brian Peake. Her father was a lorry driver before working in the electrical industry, and her mother was a part-time careworker. Her older sister, Lisa, who was born in 1965, is a police officer. Peake's parents separated when she was nine and she lived with her mother until the age of 15. When her mother moved in with a new boyfriend several miles away, Peake went to live with her grandfather so she could continue her GCSE studies at Westhoughton High School, before going on to take her A-Levels at Canon Slade School in Bradshaw.

Peake joined the Octagon Youth Theatre in Bolton at age 13, before a period at the youth theatre of the Royal Exchange in Manchester. She later did a two-year performing arts course at the Salford College of Technology. During this time she appeared in productions with two leading amateur theatre companies in Bolton: The Marco Players and The Phoenix Theatre Company. Peake was a member of the Communist Party of Britain Salford branch in her youth. In her teens, Peake played for Wigan Ladies rugby league team.

Peake's early attempts to enter the acting profession were unsuccessful. She was rejected by every theatre education company in North West England, and tried unsuccessfully for three years to get into Manchester Polytechnic Theatre School and the Guildhall School of Music and Drama. However, at 21, she obtained a place at the Royal Academy of Dramatic Art (RADA). Her attempts to find sponsorship for her study at RADA were the subject of a 1996 documentary by The South Bank Show. Eventually, after being put forward by RADA, she was awarded the Patricia Rothermere Scholarship.

Career

Peake has appeared in many television and stage productions including Victoria Wood's dinnerladies, Channel 4's Shameless, in the lead role of barrister Martha Costello in the BBC's legal drama Silk and alongside John Simm in the BBC drama The Village, depicting life in a Derbyshire village during the First World War. Following career advice from Victoria Wood, between the two series of dinnerladies, Peake lost so much weight that an explanation had to be written into the script for her character, Twinkle.

Peake portrayed Moors murderer Myra Hindley in See No Evil: The Moors Murders, which was broadcast in May 2006. In January 2009, Peake appeared in her first major feature film role, as Angela, in the film Clubbed.

In 2012, Peake played the title role in Miss Julie at the Royal Exchange, Manchester, and previously played the part of Kristin in a 2000 production. She played Doll Tearsheet in the BBC2 adaptations of Henry IV, Parts I and II.

Peake wrote, directed and starred in the play Beryl: A Love Story On Two Wheels about the life of the Leeds-born cyclist Beryl Burton, which was broadcast on BBC Radio Four in November 2012. In 2014, Peake adapted her play for the stage. Entitled simply Beryl, it was commissioned by the West Yorkshire Playhouse, where it ran in June and July 2014 to coincide with the start of the Tour de France in Leeds. The play returned in June and July 2015 and toured across England in Autumn 2015. Peake wrote a later play called Queens of the Coal Age again for Radio 4 that told the story of Annie Scargill and three other women who tried to occupy a coal mine in 1993.

Peake provided the vocals for the Eccentronic Research Council's 2012 concept album 1612 Underture about the Pendle Witch Trials and for their 2015 album Johnny Rocket, Narcissist & Music Machine…I'm Your Biggest Fan. Peake also features as a crazed stalker in the music video for "Sweet Saturn Mine" by Moonlandingz; a collaborative effort by Eccentronic Research Council and Fat White Family in 2015.

In September 2013, Peake was appointed an Associate Artist of the Royal Exchange Theatre in Manchester. Her association with the theatre began in childhood and she was a member of the youth theatre. Major productions in which she has performed include The Children's Hour in 2008, for which she won a MEN Award, and Miss Julie in 2012 for which she won a Manchester Theatre Award. All of her performances at the Royal Exchange have been directed by Sarah Frankcom with whom she also collaborated on The Masque of Anarchy in 2012 for the Manchester International Festival. Building on this work, in September 2014 Frankcom went on to direct her as the title character in a radical re-imagining of Hamlet. The demand for tickets was so great that the production was extended for a week, having been "the theatre's fastest-selling show in a decade". The Guardian said of her performance: "Peake’s delicate ferocity, her particular mixture of concentration and lightness, ensure that you want to follow her whenever she appears". A year later she appeared in Frankcom's production of The Skriker, as "Caryl Churchill's shape-shifting, doom-wreaking fairy". The Guardian's Lyn Gardner listed the production in her top ten British plays of the year. In 2016, Peake resumed her partnership with Royal Exchange Artistic Director, Sarah Frankcom, to star as Blanche Dubois in Tennessee Williams' A Streetcar Named Desire. Peake's performance in the role garnered critical acclaim with The Guardian describing her performance as "exquisite" and "breathtaking".

Peake starred in Metalhead, a December 2017 episode of Netflix's Black Mirror anthology. The episode was directed by Hannibal and American Gods director, David Slade.

Peake starred as Nellie in Mike Leigh's 2018 film, Peterloo, based on the events of the 1819 Peterloo Massacre in Manchester.

Peake starred as the eponymous protagonist in the 2018 film Funny Cow alongside a cast including Paddy Considine and Stephen Graham. Tony Pitts wrote and starred in the film, which received positive reviews, in particular for Peake's "magnificent" performance.

Peake starred in, and won critical acclaim for, the lead role of Winnie in Samuel Beckett's Happy Days at the Royal Exchange Theatre in May 2018. The Guardian said she gave a "brilliant central performance, there’s barely a breath between optimism and despair". Following Happy Days, the theatre presented Queens of the Coal Age, a play written by Peake. Adapted from her earlier radio drama, Queens of the Coal Age looks at the 1993 pit closure protests by miners' wives in northern England. The play received mixed reviews.

Peake starred in The Nico Project as Velvet Underground singer Nico at the Manchester International Festival in July 2019.

Peake stars as Miss Fozzard in the 2020 BBC remake of Talking Heads, recreating a role originally played by Patricia Routledge.

Personal life
Peake is in a relationship with art director Pawlo Wintoniuk. In 2009, Peake left London after living there for 13 years. She said that living in Salford with Wintoniuk gave her the freedom to choose more risky roles and lower-paying jobs in theatre.

Political views
Peake is a feminist and socialist. She was active in communist organisations during her youth and a member of the Communist Party of Britain. In January 2014 Peake won the first Bolton Socialist Club Outstanding Contribution to Socialism Award for using her work to oppose the government's "crippling austerity measures".

In January 2016 Peake featured in the Climate Coalition's short film I Wish For You as Mia, with Jeremy Irons starring as her grandfather, to highlight the urgency of combating climate change.

In July 2015, Peake endorsed Jeremy Corbyn's campaign in the Labour Party leadership election. She wrote on her website: "For me, Jeremy Corbyn is our only beacon of hope to get the Labour Party back on track, get the electorate back in touch with politics and save this country from the constant mindless bullying of the vulnerable and poor." In 2016, along with other celebrities, Peake toured the UK to support Corbyn's bid to become prime minister.

In April 2017 Peake endorsed Labour Party leader Corbyn in the 2017 general election. She said: "I am a Corbyn supporter. My mind boggles why people treat him like the anti-Christ, but it goes to show people are a lot more right-wing than they like to believe." In November 2019, along with other public figures, Peake signed a letter supporting Corbyn, describing him as "a beacon of hope in the struggle against emergent far-right nationalism, xenophobia and racism in much of the democratic world", and endorsed him in the 2019 general election.

In June 2020 she took part in an interview with The Independent in which she stated that the practice of police officers in the United States kneeling on someone's neck, one example of which led to the murder of George Floyd in Minneapolis, was "learnt from seminars taught by Israeli secret services". The Independent amended the original article to add a note that "the allegation that US police were taught tactics of 'neck kneeling' by Israeli secret services is unfounded". Peake later stated that she was "inaccurate in [her] assumption of American police training and its sources". Peake's statement was denounced by Labour leader Keir Starmer, the Board of Deputies of British Jews and the Jewish Labour Movement as an "antisemitic conspiracy theory". Shadow Education Secretary Rebecca Long-Bailey retweeted the article and called Peake an "absolute diamond". When Jewish groups demanded she delete the tweet, Long-Bailey refused to do so, leading to her sacking from the Shadow cabinet by Starmer. John McDonnell, the shadow chancellor under Corbyn, said that "criticism of practices of [the] Israeli state is not antisemitic" and that Peake's claim "was not antisemitic".

Filmography

Film

Television

Music Videos

Theatre

Radio drama
Guilty Until Proved Innocent (2009), Dina
Geoffrey Chaucer – Troilus and Criseyde (2009), Criseyde (dramatised by Lavinia Greenlaw)
This Repulsive Woman (2010), Deborah Hurst
Craven (Series 1: 2009, Series 2, 3 & 4: 2012, Series 5: 2013, Series 6: 2014), Detective Sue Craven
Beryl: A Love Story on Two Wheels (2012), writer and performer (Beryl Burton)
Queens of the Coal Age (2013) writer and performer (Anne Scargill)
My Dad Keith (2014), writer and performer (Steph)
Betsie Coleman (2015), performer (Betsie Coleman)
Briar Road (2015), narrator (writer Jonathan Buckley)
Not in Our Name CD (2015), narrator (writer Heathcote Williams)
Only Mountains, BBC Radio Drama on 3 (writer) 8 March 2020

Radio (other) 
Only Artists (2018), meets the musician and performance artist Cosey Fanni Tutti.

Awards and nominations

References

External links
 Maxine Peake at the British Film Institute
 

1974 births
Living people
Actors from Bolton
Actresses from Lancashire
Alumni of RADA
Alumni of the University of Salford
Communist Party of Britain members
English feminists
English film actresses
English radio actresses
English Shakespearean actresses
English socialist feminists
English socialists
English stage actresses
English television actresses
Labour Party (UK) people
People educated at Canon Slade School
People from Westhoughton